Sheryl Pinto is a former Indian actress who had primarily appeared in Tamil films. She made her debut in Vijayakanth's Arasangam (2008), before featuring in other films including Engal Aasan (2009) and Vaadaa (2010).

Career
Sheryl Pinto made her acting debut with the Tamil language film Arasangam (2008) directed by Ramana Madhesh, co-starring Vijayakanth and Navaneet Kaur. She was signed again to feature alongside Vijayakanth in Engal Aasan (2009). She also appeared in the Telugu language film Satyameva Jayate (2009). In 2011, she was signed to play the lead role in Kalloori Desam but the film was shelved for unknown reasons. In 2012, she was chosen to act in Sakthi Chidambaram's Machan pairing opposite Ramesh Aravind. The film started production in early-2012 and was completed in late-2012 but it remained unreleased.

Filmography
All films are in Tamil, unless otherwise noted.

References

External links

Indian film actresses
Actresses in Tamil cinema
Living people
Year of birth missing (living people)
Actresses in Telugu cinema
21st-century Indian actresses